Idrees Kenyatta Walker (born February 1, 1979) is a former professional American football player who was an offensive tackle in the National Football League (NFL) for six seasons.  Walker played college football for the University of Florida.  A first-round pick in the 2001 NFL Draft, he played professionally for the Tampa Bay Buccaneers of the NFL.

Early years 

Walker was born in Meridian, Mississippi in 1979.  He attended Meridian High School, where he was a standout high school football player for the Meridian Wildcats.  As a senior in 1996, Walker was an all-state selection and received high school All-American honors from PrepStar and USA Today.

College career 

Walker accepted an athletic scholarship to attend the University of Florida in Gainesville, Florida, and played on the offensive line for coach Steve Spurrier's Florida Gators football team from 1998 to 2000, after redshirting in 1997.  Walker was a second-team All-Southeastern Conference (SEC) selection in 1999 and received first-team All-SEC and second-team All-American honors in 2000, winning the SEC's Jacobs Blocking Trophy as a junior in 2000.  After his junior season, Walker decided to forgo his final year of NCAA eligibility and enter the NFL Draft.

After his NFL career ended, Walker returned to Gainesville to complete his degree, graduating from the University of Florida with a bachelor's degree in sociology in 2007.

Awards and honors 

 Knoxville News-Sentinel All-SEC (1998)
 Football News Freshman All-American (1998)
 Co-recipient of Gators' Best Effort Award (1999)
 Second-team All-SEC (1999)
 Gators' Most Outstanding Offensive Lineman (2000)
 Consensus first-team All-SEC (2000)
 Jacobs Blocking Trophy (2000)
 All-American selection by Associated Press, Sporting News, Football News, Sports Xchange and Walter Camp (2000)
 Outland Trophy semifinalist (2000)

Professional career 

He was originally slated to play left tackle and protect the quarterback's blindside. However, after his rookie season he was switched to right tackle, where he found success starting for the Buccaneer's Super Bowl XXXVII victory over the Oakland Raiders. After starting in seventy-three of the seventy-five games in which he played, the Buccaneers released Walker on March 1, 2007.

On August 13, 2007, the Carolina Panthers signed Walker as a free agent. He was released by the team on September 1 during final cuts. On September 8, 2008, Walker was signed by the Toronto Argonauts of the Canadian Football League (CFL), and was assigned to their practice roster.

See also 

 2000 College Football All-America Team
 Florida Gators football, 1990–99
 List of Florida Gators football All-Americans
 History of the Tampa Bay Buccaneers
 List of Florida Gators in the NFL Draft
 List of SEC Jacobs Blocking Trophy winners
 List of Tampa Bay Buccaneers first-round draft picks
 List of University of Florida alumni

References

Bibliography 

 Carlson, Norm, University of Florida Football Vault: The History of the Florida Gators, Whitman Publishing, LLC, Atlanta, Georgia (2007).  .
 Golenbock, Peter, Go Gators!  An Oral History of Florida's Pursuit of Gridiron Glory, Legends Publishing, LLC, St. Petersburg, Florida (2002).  .
 Hairston, Jack, Tales from the Gator Swamp: A Collection of the Greatest Gator Stories Ever Told, Sports Publishing, LLC, Champaign, Illinois (2002).  .
 McCarthy, Kevin M.,  Fightin' Gators: A History of University of Florida Football, Arcadia Publishing, Mount Pleasant, South Carolina (2000).  .

1979 births
Living people
American football offensive tackles
Carolina Panthers players
Florida Gators football players
Sportspeople from Meridian, Mississippi
Tampa Bay Buccaneers players
Toronto Argonauts players